Skate shoes or skateboard shoes are a type of footwear specifically designed and manufactured for use in skateboarding. While numerous non-skaters choose to wear skate shoes as they are popular in fashion, the design of the skate shoe includes many features designed especially for use in skateboarding, including a vulcanized rubber or polyurethane sole with minimal tread pattern or no pattern, a composition leather or suede upper, and double or triple stitching to extend the life of the upper material. A low, padded tongue is often included for comfort.  The most important aspect of skate shoes is that they have flat soles which allow the skater to have better board control.

Features 
Skate shoe companies have integrated a number of special features into their shoes. These innovations have various functions, including preventing "heel bruises" (damage to the heel area of the foot caused by harsh landings from high distances), enhancement of "skateboard feel" through increased flexibility, and increased grip traction conceptually allowing the user to gain a reliable way of sensing the variety of impacts that the skateboard may encounter which in turn theoretically should lead to more predictable handling of the board while in motion. 

These include but are not limited to:
Ollie patch (Vision Street Wear/Airwalk - 1980's)
Cup soles
Vulcanized rubber soles
DURACAP (Vans)
Air pockets in the heels
Canvas
Shoelace protectors
Dynamic Grip Technology (DGT) (DC Shoes) 
Super Suede (DC Shoes) 
System G2 Cushioning (etnies, Emerica, éS)
STI foam (etnies, Emerica, éS)
Lace Loops that "hide" shoelaces
Action Leather
Thermoplastic Toe Box Reinforcement
EVA Mid Sole 
Fusion Grip Rubber Outsole
Asymmetric stabilizer
Silicone Rubber makes shoes last longer (SiRC)
Stash Pockets (under sole or tongue) (DVS, Ipath and Supra)
Shock-Absorbing insoles (Nike SB)
Kevlar-reinforced laces (Nike SB) 
Cold Grip Technology (CGT) (DVS) 
Lunarlon (Nike SB)

Many features of a skate shoe are designed to increase its durability. Skate shoes are subjected to the abrasiveness of a skateboard's grip tape on a regular basis when used for skateboarding. This is why skaters tend to go through shoes quickly. Super suede, action leather, and plastic underlying the toe cap help to extend the life of a skate shoe. Lace loops and protectors are designed to prevent laces from ripping by shielding the most common areas that come into contact with grip tape.

Other common features include triple stitching with thicker treads to prevent ripping, more width so that there is more contact with the board with thicker tongues and sides to compensate, and deep sole patterns for grip.

Examples of popular skate shoe brands 

Adidas Skateboarding
Adio
Airwalk
Circa
Converse
DC Shoes
DVS Shoe Company
Emerica
Element Skateboards
éS Footwear
Etnies
Fallen Footwear
Globe International
I-Path
Lakai Limited Footwear
New Balance Numeric
Nike Skateboarding
Osiris Shoes
Puma SE
Reebok
Supra
Vans
Vision Street Wear
World Industries
Zoo York

Further reading 
Made for Skate: The Illustrated History of Skateboard Footwear, Jürgen Blümlein, Daniel Schmid & Dirk Vogel, Gingko Press (2008)

References 

Skateboarding equipment
Footwear
Sports footwear
1990s fashion
2000s fashion
2010s fashion